Adam Russell is a baseball pitcher.

Adam Russell may also refer to:

Adam Russell (musician) in Story of the Year
Adam Russel, a member of the British parliament for Preston
Adam H. Russell, American anthropologist